Cerautola miranda, the wondrous epitola, is a butterfly in the family Lycaenidae. It is found in Guinea, Sierra Leone, Ivory Coast, Ghana, Togo, Nigeria, Cameroon, Gabon, the Republic of the Congo, the Central African Republic, Angola, the Democratic Republic of the Congo, Uganda, Kenya, Tanzania and Zambia. Its habitat consists of forests and forest edges.

Adults have been recorded feeding on the secretions of coccids and have also been observed settling on the shoots of climbers infested with aphids.

Both larvae and pupae have been found on the bark of Alstonia congensis.

Subspecies
Cerautola miranda miranda (Guinea, Sierra Leone, Ivory Coast, Ghana, Togo, western Nigeria)
Cerautola miranda vidua (Talbot, 1935) (eastern Nigeria, Cameroon, Congo, Central African Republic, Gabon, Democratic Republic of the Congo, Angola, Uganda, western Kenya, Tanzania, Zambia)

References

Butterflies described in 1889
Poritiinae
Butterflies of Africa
Taxa named by Otto Staudinger